In the 1972–73 season West Ham United finished sixth in the First Division, their highest League position under the management of Ron Greenwood and the joint-highest in their history at that time.

Season summary
Pop Robson was the First Division's top scorer with 28 League goals, including eight doubles and a hat-trick, just one behind the post-war club record held by Geoff Hurst, who had left the Hammers for Stoke City the previous summer. In February 1973, Bobby Moore overtook Jimmy Ruffell's West Ham appearance record. He won his hundredth England cap in the same month.

West Ham continued their poor Cup record from previous seasons by losing in both the FA Cup and the League Cup to lower League opposition. Second Division Hull City beat them in the fourth round of the FA Cup, and the Hammers suffered a humiliating defeat at Fourth Division Stockport County in the League Cup.

League table

Results

Football League First Division

FA Cup

League Cup

Players

References

1972-73
English football clubs 1972–73 season
1972 sports events in London
1973 sports events in London